Archibald Randolph Ammons (February 18, 1926 – February 25, 2001) was an American poet who won the annual National Book Award for Poetry in 1973 and 1993.

Poetic themes

Ammons wrote about humanity's relationship to nature in alternately comic and solemn tones. His poetry often addresses religious and philosophical matters and scenes involving nature, almost in a Transcendental fashion. According to reviewer Daniel Hoffman, his work "is founded on an implied Emersonian division of experience into Nature and the Soul,"  adding that it "sometimes consciously echo[es] familiar lines from Emerson, Whitman and Dickinson."

Life
Ammons grew up on a tobacco farm near Whiteville, North Carolina, in the southeastern part of the state. After the war, Ammons attended Wake Forest University, majoring in biology. Graduating in 1949, he served as a principal and teacher at Hattaras Elementary School later that year and also married Phyllis Plumbo. He received an M.A. in English from the University of California, Berkeley.

In 1964, Ammons joined the faculty of Cornell University, eventually becoming Goldwin Smith Professor of English and Poet in Residence. He retired from Cornell in 1998. His students who went on to achieve acclaim as poets include Alice Fulton, Ann Loomis Silsbee, and Jerald Bullis.

Ammons had been a longtime resident of the South Jersey communities of Northfield, Ocean City and Millville, when he wrote Corsons Inlet in 1962.

Awards
During the five decades of his poetic career, Ammons was the recipient of many awards and citations. Among his major honors are the 1973 and 1993 U.S. National Book Awards (for Collected Poems, 1951-1971 and for Garbage); the Wallace Stevens Award from the Academy of American Poets (1998); and a MacArthur Fellowship in 1981, the year the award was established.

Ammons's other awards include a 1981 National Book Critics Circle Award for A Coast of Trees; a 1993 Library of Congress Rebekah Johnson Bobbitt National Prize for Poetry for Garbage; the 1975 Bollingen Prize for Sphere; the Poetry Society of America's Robert Frost Medal; the Ruth Lilly Prize; and fellowships from the Guggenheim Foundation and the American Academy of Arts and Letters. He was elected a Fellow of the American Academy of Arts and Sciences in 1978.

Poetic style

Ammons often writes in two- or three-line stanzas. Poet David Lehman notes a resemblance between Ammons's terza libre (unrhymed three-line stanzas) and the terza rima of Shelley's "Ode to the West Wind." Lines are strongly enjambed.

Some of Ammons's poems are very short, one or two lines only, a form known as monostich (effectively, including the title, a kind of couplet), while others (for example, the book-length poems Sphere and Tape for the Turn of the Year) are hundreds of lines long, and sometimes composed on adding-machine tape or other continuous strips of paper. His National Book Award-winning volume Garbage is a long poem consisting of "a single extended sentence, divided into eighteen sections, arranged in couplets". Ammons's long poems tend to derive multiple strands from a single image.

Many readers and critics have noted Ammons's idiosyncratic approach to punctuation. Lehman has written that Ammons "bears out T. S. Eliot's observation that poetry is a 'system of punctuation'." Instead of periods, some poems end with an ellipsis; others have no terminal punctuation at all. The colon is an Ammons "signature"; he uses it "as an all-purpose punctuation mark."

According to critic Stephanie Burt, in many poems Ammons combines three types of diction:

Such a mixture is nearly unique, Burt says; these three modes are "almost never found together outside his poems".

In contrast, critic J. Mark Smith notes that in long poems such as Garbage, with their "improvised, no-stopping, 'one-time event' compositional procedures," "Ammons works with a continuum of utterance whose central furrows are the most frequently repeated words and phrases in the contemporary American vulgate, but whose far outcastings register the faintest traces of anomalous use." That is, Ammons subjected his own poetic style and its relation to contemporary speech to considerable scrutiny. As Smith puts it, "Ammons's premise is that the process of sorting and grouping (or abstracting) that produces what we commonly call 'garbage' also powers the appearances, disappearances, and re-appearances of words."

Bibliography

Poetry

Ommateum, with Doxology. Philadelphia: Dorrance, 1955.  Reprinted, with Preface by Roger Gilbert, Cornell University, by  W. W. Norton & Company, Inc., New York - London, 2006.   (paperback)
Expressions of Sea Level. Columbus: Ohio State UP, 1964.
Corsons Inlet. Ithaca, NY: Cornell UP, 1965. Reprinted by Norton, 1967. 
Tape for the Turn of the Year. Ithaca, NY: Cornell UP, 1965. Reprinted by Norton, 1972. 
Northfield Poems. Ithaca, NY: Cornell UP, 1966.
Selected Poems. Ithaca, NY: Cornell UP, 1968.
Uplands. New York: Norton, 1970. 
Briefings: Poems Small and Easy. New York: Norton, 1971. 
Collected Poems, 1951-1971. New York: Norton, 1972.  —winner of the National Book Award
Sphere: The Form of a Motion. New York: Norton, 1974.  —winner of the Bollingen Prize for Poetry
Diversifications. New York: Norton, 1975. 
The Selected Poems: 1951-1977. New York: Norton, 1977. 
Highgate Road. Ithaca, NY: Cornell UP, 1977.
The Snow Poems . New York: Norton, 1977. 
Selected Longer Poems. New York: Norton, 1980. 
A Coast of Trees. New York: Norton, 1981.  —winner of the National Book Critics Circle Award
Worldly Hopes. New York: Norton, 1982. 
Lake Effect Country. New York: Norton, 1983. 
The Selected Poems: Expanded Edition. New York: Norton, 1986. 
Sumerian Vistas. New York: Norton, 1987. 
The Really Short Poems. New York: Norton, 1991. 
Garbage. New York: Norton, 1993.  —winner of the National Book Award
The North Carolina Poems. Alex Albright, ed. Rocky Mount, NC: NC Wesleyan College P, 1994. 
Brink Road.New York: Norton, 1996. 
Glare. New York: Norton, 1997. 
Bosh and Flapdoodle: Poems. New York: Norton, 2005. 
Selected Poems. David Lehman, ed. New York: Library of America, 2006. 
The North Carolina Poems. New, expanded edition. Frankfort, KY: Broadstone Books, 2010. 
The Mule Poems. Fountain, NC: R. A. Fountain, 2010.  (chapbook)
The Complete Poems of A. R. Ammons, Volume 1 1955-1977; Volume 2 1978-2005: Edited by Robert M. West; Introduction by Helen Vendler.  W. W. Norton & Company, Inc., New York, 2017  hardcover vol. 1;  hardcover vol. 2

ProseSet in Motion: Essays, Interviews, and Dialogues (1996)An Image for Longing: Selected Letters and Journals of A.R. Ammons, 1951–1974. Ed. Kevin McGuirk. Victoria, BC: ELS Editions, 2014. 

Critical studies and reviews of Ammons's work
 Diacritics 3 (1973). An entire "essays on Ammons" issue.
 
 

 Review of A.R. Ammons, The Complete Poems''.

References

External links

 
Examples of Ammons poetry
A. R. Ammons Audio Collection Z. Smith Reynolds Library, Wake Forest University, Winston-Salem, North Carolina
A.R. Ammons Interviewed by David Grossvogel
Reid and Susan Overcash Literary Collection: A.R. Ammons Papers (#1096-001), East Carolina Manuscript Collection, J. Y. Joyner Library, East Carolina University
A. R. Ammons Papers 1944–1987 Southern Historical Collection, Louis Round Wilson Special Collections Library, University of North Carolina at Chapel Hill, Chapel Hill, North Carolina
Guide to the Archie Ammons Papers, 1945–2010, Division of Rare and Special Collections, Cornell University Library, Ithaca, New York

Modern American Poetry, critical essays on Ammons's works

Poets from North Carolina
Cornell University faculty
Fellows of the American Academy of Arts and Sciences
MacArthur Fellows
Members of the American Academy of Arts and Letters
National Book Award winners
People from Columbus County, North Carolina
People from Millville, New Jersey
People from Northfield, New Jersey
People from Ocean City, New Jersey
UC Berkeley College of Letters and Science alumni
Wake Forest University alumni
1926 births
2001 deaths
Bollingen Prize recipients
20th-century American poets
20th-century American musicians
United States Navy personnel of World War II
United States Navy sailors